Sulley Ali Sariki Muniru (born 25 October 1992) is a Ghanaian professional footballer who plays as a midfielder. He is the younger brother of former Inter Milan and A.C. Milan player Sulley Muntari.

Club career

Youth career
Muniru started his youth career at Ashanti Akim Missiles, a youngster club in his hometown Konongo. He helped his college team to win the national championship, being voted the best player. He then played for the youth team of Liberty Professionals where he was the kingpin.

Muniru's urge to also pursue his career in Europe like his elder brother Sulley Muntari grew strongly. At the age of 18, Sulley joined Real Madrid on a trial.

CFR Cluj
During the 2013 January transfer window, Muniru signed the first professional contract of his career. The midfielder was signed by CFR Cluj as a replacement for playmaker Modou Sougou, who left the club for Marseille. He worn the number 48 on the jersey to celebrate his mother's (née Hajia Kande) birthday.

FCSB
In June 2015, aged 22, Muniru joined FCSB on a four-year contract, with the Romanian champions paying an undisclosed fee for his transfer. He scored his first goal for the club against AS Trenčín, in the Champions League second qualifying round's second leg.

Tondela
On 28 November 2017, Muniru joined Tondela on a deal until June 2019. He made a total of four appearances for the club and assisted once.

Tambov
On 15 August 2019, he joined Russian Premier League club FC Tambov. He was removed by Tambov from their squad on 30 May 2020, after only appearing in one Russian Cup game for the club up to that point.

Asante Kotoko
Muniru joined Asante Kotoko on 2 November 2020 on a free transfer on a two-year contract. He left the club on 22 January 2021 after making just five appearances. Muniru later thanked the management of Asante Kotoko for his stay at the club and allowing him to leave.

Minsk 
In February 2021, Muniru signed an 8-month deal with FC Minsk as a free agent after his contract with Asante Kotoko was terminated. The deal he signed is to keep him at the club until December 2021 with an option of renewal.

International career 
He has represented his country at Under-12 and U-15 levels.

Career statistics

Club

Honours

Club
CFR Cluj
Cupa României: Runner-up 2012–13

Steaua București
League Cup: 2015–16
Supercupa României: Runner-up 2015

References

External links
 
 

1992 births
Living people
Ghanaian Muslims
Ghanaian footballers
Association football midfielders
Ghanaian expatriate footballers
Expatriate footballers in Romania
Expatriate footballers in Portugal
Expatriate footballers in Turkey
Expatriate footballers in Belarus
Ghanaian expatriate sportspeople in Romania
Ghanaian expatriate sportspeople in Portugal
Liga I players
Liberty Professionals F.C. players
CFR Cluj players
FC Steaua București players
C.D. Tondela players
Yeni Malatyaspor footballers
FC Dinamo Minsk players
Expatriate footballers in Russia
FC Tambov players
Asante Kotoko S.C. players
FC Minsk players